Gina M. Melaragno is an American politician serving as a member of the Maine House of Representatives from the 62nd district. Elected in November 2014, she assumed office on December 3, 2014.

Early life and education 
Melaragno was raised in Auburn, Maine and graduated from Edward Little High School. She earned an associate degree in liberal arts from the University of Southern Maine.

Career 
Outside of politics, Melaragno has worked as a customer service representative and in the healthcare industry. She was elected to the Maine House of Representatives in November 2014 and assumed office on December 3, 2014.

References 

Living people
Democratic Party members of the Maine House of Representatives
Women state legislators in Maine
University of Southern Maine alumni
People from Auburn, Maine
People from Androscoggin County, Maine
Year of birth missing (living people)